Andre Pollehn (born 3 May 1969) is a retired German motorcycle racer and competed in Grasstrack, Longtrack and Speedway.

World Longtrack Championship

Finals
 1989  Marianske Lazne (7th) 19pts
 1994  Marianske Lazne (Second) 20pts
 1995  Scheeßel (10th) 6pts

Grand-Prix Years
 1999 5 apps (8th) 55pts
 2002 3 apps (18) 19pts

European Grasstrack Championship

Finalist
  1998 Schwarme (7th) 12pts
  2001 Noordwolde (9th) 8pts

External links
 https://grasstrackgb.co.uk/andre-pollehn/
 http://wwosbackup.proboards.com/thread/2164

 1969 births
 German speedway riders
 Living people
 Individual Speedway Long Track World Championship riders
 Ipswich Witches riders
 Long Eaton Invaders riders
 Middlesbrough Bears riders